John Dyrby Paulsen (born 12 July 1963) is a Danish politician. He is a member of the party Social Democrats, and is the current mayor of Slagelse Municipality. He was elected mayor after the 2017 Danish local elections, though has been in the municipal council since 2014. Before that he sat in the Folketing under two different constituencies from 2006 to 2015. He also acted as a temporary member of parliament twice, first period between 10 March 2005 to 30 April 2005 and second period between 6 September 2005 to 6 February 2006. He also sat in the municipal council of the now defunct Korsør Municipality between 1998 and 2005.

References 

1963 births
Living people
Danish municipal councillors
Mayors of places in Denmark
People from Korsør
Social Democrats (Denmark) politicians
Members of the Folketing 2005–2007
Members of the Folketing 2007–2011
Members of the Folketing 2011–2015